Shri Krishna Leela is a 1971 Hindi religious film directed by Homi Wadia. It was produced by his Basant Pictures banner. Written by B. M. Vyas, the story and dialogue were by S. N. Tripathi. The music was composed by S. N. Tripathi and had lyrics by B. M. Vyas. The film starred Sachin, Hina, Jayshree Gadkar, Sapru, Manhar Desai and Tabassum. The film was dubbed into Malayalam as Sree Krishnaleela.

The film tells the story of Lord Krishna in his childhood form, from his birth to the killing of his uncle, Raja Kansa.

Plot
Raja Kansa (Sapru) has been told by an oracle that he will be killed by the eighth male child born to his sister Devaki (Padmarani). He has Devaki and her husband Vasudeva imprisoned and kills off all the children born to them. When the eighth child, a boy, is born, Vasudev manages to leave him with Nanda and Yashoda, who become his foster parents. The film shows some miracles with the ogress and serpents. It also focuses on Radha (an older married woman) and Krishna's love story. The film ends with a wrestling match between the boy Krishna and a wrestler, which Krishna wins, and his killing of Raja Kansa. Krishna frees his parents from the prison.

Cast
 Sachin as Krishna
 Hina as Radha
 Jayshree Gadkar as Yashoda
 Sapru as Raja Kans
 Manhar Desai
 Dighe
 Tabassum as Rasili
 Ratnamala
 Deepak
 Padmarani as Devaki
 Uma Dutt
 Shekhar Purohit
 Tun Tun
 Dalpat
 Habib as Kaalia

Music
The music director was S. N. Tripathi with lyrics written by B. M. Vyas. The playback singing was given by Asha Bhosle, Manna Dey, Dolly Davjekar, Sunil and Usha Timothy.

Song list

References

External links

1970 films
1970s Hindi-language films
Films directed by Homi Wadia
Films scored by S. N. Tripathi
Hindu mythological films
Films based on the Mahabharata
Films about Krishna